Silk is the self-titled second studio album by American R&B group Silk. It was released on November 28, 1995 through Elektra Records. The album peaked at number forty-six on the US Billboard 200 chart.

Critical reception

Stephen Thomas Erlewine at Allmusic called the group's vocals on the album "impressive." Erlewine also gave note to the production, which he referred to as "seamless without being overly slick. The only problem with Silk, then, is the wildly uneven material." The ballad "How Could You Say You Love Me," and third single "Don't Rush" were praised by Upscale magazine.

Chart performance
Silk peaked at forty-six on the US Billboard 200.

Track listing

Notes
  signifies a co-producer

Personnel
Information taken from Allmusic.
art direction – Alli
assistant engineering – Gerardo Lopez
design – Alli
drum programming – Rory Bennett, John Howcott, Gerald Levert, Edwin Nicholas, Donald Parks
engineering – Tina Antoine, Jeff Bordett, Mike Chapman, John Howcott, Lisa Po-Ying Huang, Jay Lean, Paul Logus, Lee Mars, Carl Nappa, Alex Nesmith, Donald Parks, Jason Shablik, Ron A. Shaffer, Louie Teran, Darin Whittington
executive production – Silk
grooming – Dennis Mitchell
group – Silk
guitar – Craig B., Rob Cunningham, Charlie Singleton
keyboard programming – Rory Bennett, John Howcott, Gerald Levert, Myron McKinley, Edwin Nicholas, Donald Parks
keyboards – Mike Chapman, Gary Jenkins, Trent Thomas
make-up – Gwynnis Mosby
mixing – Charles "Prince Charles" Alexander, Rob Chiarelli, Jay Lean, Tony Maserati, Johnny Most, Ron A. Shaffer, Soulshock
multi-instruments – Myron McKinley, Darin Whittington
photography – Marc Baptiste
production – Tina Antoine, Rory Bennett, Mike Chapman, Dave Hall, John Howcott, Gary Jenkins, Karlin, Gerald Levert, Myron McKinley, Edwin Nicholas, Emanuel Officer, Donald Parks, Silk, Soulshock, Trent Thomas, Darin Whittington
sample programming – Mike Chapman
sequencing – Gerald Levert, Edwin Nicholas
stylist – Agnes Cammock
synthesizer – Gary Jenkins
vocal arranging – Horace Brown, Gordon Chambers, Karlin, Gerald Levert, Andrea Martin, Ivan Matias, Emanuel Officer, Soulshock
vocals (background) – Silk

Charts

Weekly charts

Year-end charts

Release history

References

External links
 
 Silk at Discogs

1995 albums
Albums produced by Gerald Levert
Albums produced by Soulshock and Karlin
Elektra Records albums
Silk (group) albums